My Diet Is Better Than Yours is an American reality competition television series which premiered on ABC on January 7, 2016. The weight-loss series features five contestants who each picks a trainer and a type of diet that they believe are the most suitable for them; the competitors subsequently  drop their trainers in the elimination process if the results are not satisfactory.

Trainers 
The trainers, their background  and their method of dieting chosen throughout the program are:
 Shaun T  Host
 Anna Kaiser  Co-host
 Dawn Jackson Blatner
 Abel James
 Carolyn Barnes
 Rob Sulaver
 Jovanka Ciares
 Jennifer Cassetta 
 Jay Cardiello

Contestant Progress

Jasmin with The Superfood Swap Diet won the competition and won $50,000.

Episodes

References

External links 
 Official website
 

American Broadcasting Company original programming
2016 American television series debuts
2016 American television series endings
2010s American reality television series
English-language television shows
Fitness reality television series
Obesity in the United States